The Diocese of Swansea and Brecon was established as a Diocese of the Church in Wales in 1923 with Brecon Priory as the cathedral. The area of the diocese had formerly been the Archdeaconry of Brecon within the Diocese of St Davids. The diocese has a border with each of the other five Welsh dioceses, as well as with the English Diocese of Hereford.

Edward Latham Bevan was made Assistant Bishop in the Diocese of St Davids as Bishop of Swansea in 1915, and in 1923 he was elected as the first Bishop of the new diocese.

The Bishop of Swansea and Brecon

After the 9th Bishop of Swansea and Brecon, John Davies retired on 2nd May 2021, the process of electing a new bishop began. After the electoral college held at St Mary's Church, Swansea was unable to elect a bishop with the requisite two-thirds majority, it fell to the Bench of Bishops to choose a new bishop. On the 4th November 2021 the Bench announced that they had chosen the Archdeacon of Wrexham, John Lomas to be the 10th Bishop of Swansea and Brecon. This election was confirmed at a Sacred Synod held at St Giles' Church, Wrexham on 22 November 2021.

Senior clergy in the diocese

The current Dean of Brecon is Paul Shackerley. The current Archdeacons of the diocese are:
Brecon — Alan Jevons
Gower — Jonathan Davies
With responsibility for Ministry Areas — Peter Brooks

Archdeaconries and deaneries 

The original deaneries were Brecon I, Brecon II, Crickhowell, Hay, Builth, Maelienydd, Swansea, Cwmtawe, Gower, Clyne, Penderi, Llwchwr and Knighton.

List of churches 
The diocese is in the process of creating a collection of Ministry Areas.

Afon Tawe (Swansea) Deanery

Closed churches in the area

Greater Brecon Deanery

Closed churches in the area

Greater Gower Deanery

Closed churches in the area

Radnor and Builth Deanery

Closed churches in the area

References 

Dioceses of the Church in Wales